Carlos Tatay (born 7 May 2003) is a Spanish motorcycle rider who is scheduled to compete in the 2023 FIM CEV Moto2 European Championship for the Pertamina Mandalika SAG Team. He previously competed in the Moto3 class in the motorcycle world championship with Prüstel GP and is also a previous winer of the Red Bull MotoGP Rookies Cup, having won the title in 2019.

Career

Early career
Tatay debuted in the FIM CEV Moto3 Junior World Championship mid-way through the 2018 season, ultimately finishing in 24th place. He also took part in the Red Bull MotoGP Rookies Cup in 2018, winning in just his second race, and finishing the season in 5th place with 4 podiums and 148 points total.

In 2019, Tatay again completed double-duty in both series. In CEV Moto3, he won 4 races and finished 2nd in the championship, while in the 2019 Red Bull MotoGP Rookies Cup, Tatay won 4 races, finishing on the podium in 9 of the first 10 races, clinching the championship win. Having secured the championship at the penultimate round in Misano, Tatay missed the season finale double-header in Aragon, as he was promoted to a wildcard slot in the Moto3 world championship race there.

Moto3 World Championship 
Tatay made his grand prix debut in 2019 as a wildcard rider in the Catalan grand prix, where he finished 12th. He repeated this result in his second entry at the Aragon grand prix. His point-scoring performances in his first two debut races earned him a full-season in the 2020 championship with Avintia.

Riding full time in the 2020 Moto3 World Championship for the Avintia Esponsorama Racing team as the lone rider, Tatay had an up and down year. He finished in the points six times, twice in the top 10 (France and Valencia), but also crashed out twice (Jerez and Barcelona). His season's best result was a 6th place finish in Valencia, overall scoring 26 points, finishing 22nd in the standings.

Staying with the Avintia Esponsorama team for the 2021 season, this time partnered by Niccolò Antonelli, Tatay basically replicated his 2020 season: he finished with 6 point scoring races, a season high best result of 6th (this time in Jerez), and 21st in the standings, with 40 points. Tatay was not given a new contract by the team following the season.

For 2022, Tatay is signed to race for CFMoto Prüstel GP, along with Xavier Artigas.

FIM Moto2 European Championship

2023
From 2023, he competed for the Pertamina Mandalika SAG Team.

Career statistics

Red Bull MotoGP Rookies Cup

Races by year
(key) (Races in bold indicate pole position; races in italics indicate fastest lap)

FIM CEV Moto3 Junior World Championship

Races by year
(key) (Races in bold indicate pole position, races in italics indicate fastest lap)

Grand Prix motorcycle racing

By season

By class

Races by year
(key) (Races in bold indicate pole position; races in italics indicate fastest lap)

Personal life
Tatay comes from Alaquàs in the Valencian Community. He is an only child. He cites his racing idols as Marc Márquez, Maverick Viñales and Johann Zarco.

References

External links

 Profile on Red Bull Rookies Cup

Spanish motorcycle racers
Sportspeople from Valencia
Moto3 World Championship riders
2003 births
Living people